Open is an Indian English-language weekly magazine. Founded by Sandipan Deb, former executive editor of Outlook and editor of Financial Express, it was launched on 2 April 2009 in 12 Indian cities. The magazine is the flagship brand of Open Media Network, the media venture of RP-Sanjiv Goenka Group.

Staff changes 
A report in The Indian Express in April 2012 concerning government apprehension about army movements was criticised in OPEN by the then editorial chairman of Outlook, Vinod Mehta, in an interview with Hartosh Singh Bal. Mehta called the story a mistake and a "plant". In May 2012, the Express sent a legal notice to Open asking for an apology, for the contentious story to be removed from the online edition, for OPEN to pay  500 crores to the Express, and for the journalists who wrote the contentious Express story.

In November 2013, Hartosh Singh Bal, who was political editor of OPEN, was sacked. The then editor, Manu Joseph, said that the magazine's proprietor, Sanjiv Goenka, thought that Bal's writings and appearances on television were resulting in him "making a lot of ... political enemies." Joseph himself resigned when P. R. Ramesh became managing editor.

Citing several instances of "press censorship", including the controversial firing of Hartosh Singh Bal, a July 2014 editorial in the New York Times commented that:

In 2014, after Bal, Joseph, and Rahul Pandita had left, the magazine issued a clarification and expressed regret for the Mehta column. Mehta, Bal and Joseph then complained that the new editorial team of OPEN had violated journalistic norms because they had not been contacted before the issue of the clarification and that there was no way for OPEN to make the claims it was making in its clarification.

, the editor is S. Prasannarajan. Rajmohan Radhakrishnan was its publisher until 2014 and was succeeded by Mohit Hira. After his exit in 2016, Manas Mohan was appointed in his place but left after nine months and was replaced by Ashok Bindra in 2017.

Neeraja Chawla joined as the CEO of Open Media Network in 2018.

References

External links 

2009 establishments in Delhi
English-language magazines published in India
Magazines established in 2009
Magazines published in Delhi
News magazines published in India
Political magazines published in India
RPG Group
Weekly magazines published in India
RPSG Group